Skipwith is a village in Yorkshire.

Skipwith may also refer to:

People
Skipwith baronets, England
Sir Grey Skipwith, 8th Baronet (1771–1852)
Skipwith Cannell (1887–1957), American poet
Fulwar Skipwith (1765–1839), American diplomat and politician
Henry Skipwith (died 1588), Member of Parliament 
Henry Skipwith (born 1751), American politician
Sofka Skipwith (1907–1994), Russian princess and social activist
Thomas Skipwith (disambiguation)
William Skipwith (disambiguation)

Places
Skipwith, Virginia, an unincorporated community in the US
Skipwith Hall, an historic mansion in Maury County, Tennessee, US
Skipwith railway station, Skipwith, North Yorkshire, England